Wei Zi (born January 1956) is a Chinese film and television actor.

Early life
Born and raised in Ningxia, he was originally named Wang Wei.

Education
He graduated from the Ningxia College of Art in 1978 and was assigned to the Ningxia Repertory Theatre the same year.

In 1985, he was accepted to the Central Theatre Academy. It was one of the two higher educational institutions of modern theatre in entire China and highly professional coming only second to the Shanghai Theatre Academy.

In January 1989, Wei Zi was admitted to Beijing People's Art Theatre, a first-rate national theatre company of China where he was recognized as a National Class-A Actor (国家一级演员). He left BPAT in 1994.

Career

Early work
For his 1988 university graduation, it was required for the students to perform in a play entitled "Stories of Mulberry Village" based on Zhu Xiaoping's three novellas about hardship and struggles in a village in Northern China. Wei played the role of a lunatic farmer and received the highest score for his performance. Later the play went public and unprecedentedly was a huge success. People's Daily described it as "Turning a New Leaf of China's Modern Theatre" and senior authorities such as drama master and Beijing People's Art Theater president Cao Yu and vice-president of the Chinese Film Artists' Association Chen Huangmei who seldom seen in public events attended the performance. Wei was and won the Plum Blossom Award for the best performer in 1988.

Wei's first appearance in front of the camera dates back to 1989 when he acted in the "Ballad of the Yellow River", a film by the famous director Teng Wenji which describes the past lives of the people living along the old course of the Yellow River. It won the Best Director Award in the 14th Montréal World Film Festival . Their cooperation continued in 1996 with "The Conqueror" and "The Story of Xiangxiang" and again in 2005 with another Montréal World Film Festival nominee  "Sunrise, Sunset",.

Other activities
In 1992 he starred in his second movie "The Scientist Jiang Zhuying", a biographical based on the true life of Jiang Zhuying for which he was nominated for a best actor award at the  Golden Rooster Awards. The film itself was awarded the Best Feature Film Prize by the Ministry of Radio, Film, and Television . The same year Wei Zi appeared in his first TV drama entitled "Qing Man Zhu Jiang". In 1994 he was nominated again for the best actor award at the Golden Rooster Awards for his notable performance in the movie "Stay in the Village".

In 2000, China Central Television (CCTV) decided to produce a mainland adaptation of one of Jin Yong's Wuxia novels entitled The Smiling, Proud Wanderer. Wei Zi was offered the role of the negative character of the novel Yue Buqun because the director Huang Jianzhong believed that he was the only one who could perform that difficult character very well . At first Wei Zi showed no interest in it since it was a martial arts themed project but agreed to read the script. Upon reading the scenario he noticed the dual characteristics of the hypocrite Yue Buqun who was wearing a gentleman's face while a devil was hidden inside him. Wei Zi found this a challenging role and finally expressed his acceptance of doing it. His successful development of the character was received quite well by both the audience and the critics and paved the way more for his further presence in the TV dramas. "The Great Dunhuang", "The Red Merchant Hu Xue Yan", "Thrill", "Betrayal", "The World's First Restaurant" and "DA Division" are some of his other notable series in the 21st century.

Filmography

Film

Television

Notable Stage Performances
 Stories of Mulberry Village 《桑树坪纪事》 (1988)
 Tiger Tally 《虎符》

Sources

External links
 

Male actors from Ningxia
1956 births
Living people
Chinese male stage actors
Chinese male film actors
Chinese male television actors